Thapsia microsculpta is a species of air-breathing land snail or semi-slug, a terrestrial pulmonate gastropod mollusk in the family Urocyclidae.

Distribution
This species is endemic to Tanzania.

References

 

Fauna of Tanzania
Thapsia
Taxonomy articles created by Polbot